The Moldovan Sportspersonality of the Year is chosen annually since 2005 by the national Ministry of Youth and Sports. In addition, the best female athlete is nominated each year and the best trainer.

Winners

References 

Sport in Moldova
National sportsperson-of-the-year trophies and awards
Awards established in 2005
2005 establishments in Moldova
Moldovan awards